is a railway station on the Minobu Line of Central Japan Railway Company (JR Central) located in the town of Minobu, Minamikoma District, Yamanashi Prefecture, Japan.

Lines
Shimobe-onsen Station is served by the Minobu Line and is located 51.7 kilometers from the southern terminus of the line at Fuji Station.

Layout
Shimobe-onsen Station has one island platform connected by a level crossing. The station is unattended.

Platform

Adjacent stations

History
The line came under control of the Japanese Government Railways on May 1, 1941. The JGR became the JNR (Japan National Railway) after World War II. Along with the division and privatization of JNR on April 1, 1987, the station came under the control and operation of the Central Japan Railway Company. The station was renamed to its present name on December 14, 1991.

Surrounding area
 Shimobe onsen

See also
 List of railway stations in Japan

External links

  Minobu Line station information 

Railway stations in Japan opened in 1927
Railway stations in Yamanashi Prefecture
Minobu Line
Minobu, Yamanashi